Lodi may refer to the following places in the U.S. state of Mississippi:

Lodi, Humphreys County, Mississippi
Lodi, Montgomery County, Mississippi